Helmet is an American alternative metal band from New York City, New York. Formed in 1989, the group originally featured guitarist and vocalist Page Hamilton, guitarist Peter Mengede, bassist Henry Bogdan and drummer John Stanier. The group released its debut album Strap It On in 1990, followed by Meantime in 1992 on Interscope Records. Due to increased tensions with frontman Hamilton, Mengede was fired from the band on February 17, 1993. After his dismissal, the guitarist went on to form the supergroup Handsome. Rob Echeverria was enlisted to perform on the 1994 album Betty, although he also left the band in 1996 to join Biohazard. Helmet recorded Aftertaste as a three-piece, with Hamilton performing all guitars. After touring with former Orange 9mm guitarist Chris Traynor, the band broke up in 1998.

In 2003, it was announced that Helmet had reformed with bassist Rob "Blasko" Nicholson and drummer John Tempesta joining Hamilton and Traynor. A spokesperson for Hamilton later debunked the news, but noted that Hamilton and Traynor were working on an unidentified project. In early 2004 the Helmet reformation was officially announced, with former Anthrax bassist Frank Bello and Tempesta joining the group. Bello left to return to Anthrax in early 2005, with Jeremy Chatelain taking his place for remaining tour dates. Tempesta left in early 2006 to join The Cult, with Mike Jost taking his place a few months later. In September, more lineup changes were announced as both Traynor and Jost left the group. New additions Kyle Stevenson (drums) and Jon Fuller (bass) were announced the following month, which also marked Chatelain's departure. Jimmy Thompson took Traynor's place later, although only remained with the band until late 2007 before being replaced by Dan Beeman the following February.

Helmet returned with new studio album Seeing Eye Dog in 2010, which featured a returning Traynor on bass; Dave Case was officially announced as the group's new touring bassist around the same time. The band released its eighth studio album Dead to the World in 2016, which was the first to feature Case.

Members

Current

Former

Timeline

Lineups

References

External links
Helmet official website

 
Helmet